Adam Dixon (born August 13, 1989) is a Canadian ice sledge hockey player.

Life and career
Born in Midland, Ontario, Dixon was diagnosed with Ewing's sarcoma in his right tibia in 1999 at the age of 10 and underwent a 10-hour surgery to remove the tumor and part of his tibia. After this surgery Dixon was unable to play able-bodied hockey and was introduced to sledge hockey at the age of 11. Dixon played 6 years with the Elmvale Bears and at the age of 17 was invited to try out for the Canadian National Sledge hockey team. At the conclusion of the tryout Dixon was asked to join the team for the 2006/2007 season. Dixon continues to play defence for the team and was a member of the 2007/2008 team that won gold at 2008 IPC Ice Sledge Hockey World Championships and was named the Defensive M.V.P. of the tournament.

Career statistics

International

External links
 
 
 

1989 births
Living people
Canadian sledge hockey players
Canadian ice hockey defencemen
Paralympic sledge hockey players of Canada
Paralympic silver medalists for Canada
Paralympic bronze medalists for Canada
Ice hockey people from Ontario
Ice sledge hockey players at the 2010 Winter Paralympics
Ice sledge hockey players at the 2014 Winter Paralympics
Para ice hockey players at the 2018 Winter Paralympics
Para ice hockey players at the 2022 Winter Paralympics
Medalists at the 2014 Winter Paralympics
Medalists at the 2018 Winter Paralympics
Medalists at the 2022 Winter Paralympics
People from Midland, Ontario
Paralympic medalists in sledge hockey